Elasmostethus is a genus of shield bugs belonging to the family Acanthosomatidae.

Species
Species within this genus include:
Elasmostethus atricornis 
Elasmostethus brevis 
Elasmostethus cruciatus 
Elasmostethus dorsalis  
Elasmostethus emeritus 
Elasmostethus humeralis 
Elasmostethus interstinctus  – birch shieldbug 
Elasmostethus ligatus 
Elasmostethus lineus 
Elasmostethus nigropunctatus 
Elasmostethus minor 
Elasmostethus sastragaloides 
Elasmostethus suffusus 
Elasmostethus taeniolus 
Elasmostethus tristriatus

References

Acanthosomatidae
Pentatomomorpha genera